, better known by the stage name , was a Japanese voice actor born in Fukushima Prefecture, Japan. He was employed by the talent management firm Aoni Production.

Between the ages of three and six, Azusa was trained in the theatre. At the age of five, he was given the name Kinzō Azusa. On May 1, 1962, Azusa undertook the establishment of a coaching foundation, Gekidan Geikyō (currently represented by Takeshi Aono). Azusa died in 1997 at the age of 66.

Anime

TV
Dragon Ball Z (Mūri)
Dragon Ball Z: Bardock – The Father of Goku (Grandpa Son Gohan)
Dragon Quest (Chōrō)
Dragon Quest: The Adventure of Dai (King Romosu)
Fortune Quest (Mishuran)
Kiteretsu Daihyakka (Heikichi)
Meiken Joly (Philippe)
Paul no Miracle Taisakusen (Detective Tokkamēru)
Pro Golfer Saru (Kyūsei)
Time Bokan (Nariikin)

OVA
Aladdin and the King of Thieves (Sultan)
Legend of the Galactic Heroes (Wilhelm von Klopstock)
The Return of Jafar (Sultan)

Movies
The Castle of Cagliostro (Archbishop)
Ge Ge Ge no Kitarō: Gekitotsu!! Ijigen Yōkai no Daihanran (Mizugi-sensei)
Dragon Ball Z: The Return of Cooler (Mūri)
Sangokushi 3: Haruka naru Daichi (Wang Lei)

Voice-over work
Keiji Eden: Tsuisekisha (Rebi)

Production
Azusa produced or took part in the following plays, listed in alphabetical order.
Daddy-Long-Legs
Haha wo Tazunete
The Wild Swans
Ivan the Fool
The Little Match Girl
Poetical Collage
Shi to Rōdoku no Yūbe

References

External links
 
 

1931 births
1997 deaths
Japanese male voice actors
Male voice actors from Fukushima Prefecture
20th-century Japanese male actors
21st-century Japanese male actors
Aoni Production voice actors
Deaths from cancer in Japan
Deaths from laryngeal cancer